The Tesla Powerwall is a rechargeable lithium-ion battery stationary home energy storage product manufactured by Tesla Energy. The Powerwall stores electricity for solar self-consumption, time of use load shifting, and backup power. The Powerwall was introduced in 2015 with limited production. Mass production started in early 2017 at Tesla's Giga Nevada factory. As of May 2021, Tesla has installed 200,000 Powerwalls.

Tesla Energy also offers larger battery energy storage devices: the Powerpack, intended for use by businesses, and the Megapack, intended for electrical grid use.

History 
As Tesla Motors (now Tesla, Inc.) developed batteries for its electric car business, the company also started experimenting with using batteries for energy storage. Starting in 2012, Tesla installed prototype battery packs (later developed into the Tesla Powerpack) at the locations of a few industrial customers.

 
In November 2013, Tesla announced that it would build Giga Nevada, a factory to produce lithium-ion batteries.

On April 30, 2015, the company announced that it would apply its battery technology to a home energy storage system: the Powerwall. The device would allow customers to store electricity for solar self-consumption, time-of-use load-shifting, and backup power.

The device was initially announced to have power output of 2 kilowatt (kW) continuous and 3.3 kW peak, but CEO Elon Musk said at the June 2015 Tesla shareholders meeting that this would be more than doubled to 5 kW steady with 7 kW peak, with no increase in price. Two models of Powerwall were planned: a 7 kilowatt-hour (kWh) capacity model for daily cycle use (solar self-consumption, time of use load shifting) and a higher capacity 10 kWh model for customers who also wanted backup power. By March 2016, however, Tesla had removed all references to its 10 kWh battery from the Powerwall website, as well as the company's press kit. The production units would ultimately offer a capacity of 6.4 kWh.

Five hundred pilot units were built and installed during 2015, each being built at the Tesla Fremont Factory. The Giga Nevada factory started limited production of Powerwalls and Powerpacks in the first quarter of 2016 using battery cells produced elsewhere, and began mass production of cells in January 2017.

The Powerwall 2 was unveiled in October 2016 at Universal Studios' Colonial Street backlot set. The Powerwall 2 had a 13.5 kWh capacity and was capable of delivering 5 kW of power continuously and up to 7 kW of peak power in short bursts (up to 10 seconds). Powerwall 2 devices were paired with a device called the Backup Gateway, which acted as a transfer switch and a load center.

In April 2020, Tesla announced that it had installed 100,000 Powerwalls, five years after introducing the product.

Tesla started making several refinements to the Powerwall in 2021. On April 26, during the First Quarter 2021 Financial Results call with investors, the company announced that it had been quietly shipping upgraded versions of the Powerwall 2 since November 2020, which could deliver higher amounts of power, and that the functionality would be enabled via an over-the-air software update. Just a few days later, on April 29, the company started filing for building permits for projects that would use the Powerwall+, a device that combines the functions of a Powerwall 2, the Tesla Backup Gateway and the Tesla Solar Inverter. The combination simplifies installation and allows for even greater power delivery during periods of full sun.

In May 2021, Tesla announced that it had installed 200,000 Powerwalls, selling 100,000 devices in a single year, the same amount that the company had previously taken five years to achieve. The next month, in July 2021, Musk revealed that the company had a backlog of 80,000 Powerwall orders, but due to the global chip shortage, the company would only be able to make less than 35,000 units in the quarter.

Powerwall models 
Tesla has offered several models of the Powerwall since its introduction in April 2015.

The original Powerwall (retroactively referred to as the Powerwall 1) had a 6.4 kWh capacity and was capable of delivering 3.3 kW of power.

Tesla introduced an improved Powerwall 2 in October 2016 with a 13.5 kWh capacity and capable of delivering 5 kW of power continuously and up to 7 kW of peak power in short bursts (up to 10 seconds). Later versions of the Powerwall 2, shipped after November 2020, had the same capacity, but can deliver 5.8 kW of power continuously and up to 10 kW of peak power.

The Powerwall+, introduced in April 2021, combines the functions of a Powerwall 2, a Backup Gateway and a solar inverter.

Up to 10 Powerwall 2 or Powerwall+ units may be combined to expand the capacity and maximum power of the system.

Technology 

The Powerwall is optimized for daily cycling, such as for load shifting. Tesla uses proprietary technology for packaging and cooling the cells in packs with liquid coolant. Musk promised not to start patent infringement lawsuits against anyone who, in good faith, used Tesla's technology for Powerwalls as he had promised with Tesla cars.

The Powerwall 1 battery uses nickel-manganese-cobalt chemistry and can be cycled 5,000 times before warranty expiration. The Powerwall has a 92.5% round-trip efficiency when charged or discharged by a 400–450 V system at 2 kW with a temperature of  when the product is brand new. Age of the product, temperatures above or below , and charge rates or discharge rates above 2 kW would lower this efficiency number, decreasing the system performance.

Powerwall 1 includes a DC-to-DC converter to sit between a home's existing solar panels and the home's existing DC to AC inverter. If the existing inverter is not storage-ready, one must be purchased.

Powerwall 2 incorporates a DC-to-AC inverter of Tesla's own design. Production of the 2170 cell type for the Powerwall 2 began at Giga Nevada 1 in January 2017.

The National Fire Protection Association conducted two worst-case scenario tests in 2016, igniting Powerpacks to initiate thermal runaway. The design contained damage within the Powerwall structures.

Return-on-investment calculations 

A May 2015 article in Forbes magazine calculated that using a Tesla Powerwall 1 model combined with solar panels in a home would cost 30 cents/kWh for electricity if a home remains connected to the grid (the article acknowledges that the Tesla battery could make economic sense in applications that are entirely off-grid). US consumers got electricity from the power grid for 12.5 cents/kWh on average. The article concluded the "...Tesla's Powerwall Is Just Another Toy For Rich Green People."

Bloomberg and Catalytic Engineering also agreed that the Tesla system was most useful in places where electricity prices are high. Examples of locations with very high electricity prices are Hawaii and other remote islands that generate electricity with fuel that must be shipped-in.

Another possible savings comes from areas with time-of-use (TOU) pricing. For example, Northern California's Pacific Gas and Electric Company charged as low as 12 cents/kWh in 2021 during the off-peak hours (12a–3p) and as high as 52 cents/kWh during the peak hours (4p–9p). When configured for cost savings, the Powerwall can allow a home to go off-grid during peak hours, avoiding the highest cost power usage.

The Swiss bank UBS said that the Powerwall makes sense in Australia and Germany where electricity is very costly but solar panels are well distributed.

As of October 2019, the Tesla Powerwall 2 costs $14,600 for the recommended two units (plus $2,500 to $4,500 for installation) in the US; this price does not include the cost of solar panels.

Competition 
Since Tesla introduced the Powerwall, many other companies have started offering home battery backup products, especially companies that compete with Tesla Energy to sell photovoltaic solar energy generation systems.

Three companies dominate the battery energy storage market: Enphase Energy, LG Chem, and Tesla. Together, these three brands accounted for about 85 percent of the sales in 2021.

The Enphase battery is sold alongside the company's solar micro-inverters (which convert DC power generated by solar panels into AC power using small modules behind each panel) as part of a complete AC-based home energy system. The system is currently the most expensive home battery product, at roughly 50% more than Tesla's Powerwall. Despite the large price difference, in 2021, Enphase surpassed Tesla as the largest supplier of home energy storage systems.

See also 
Net metering systems with integrated energy storage

References

External links 
 
 Tesla unveils batteries to power homes, BBC
 Why Tesla is backing batteries, BBC
 2015 Conference call with Elon Musk (Whole transcript, subscribed. Transcript in 15 pages)
Tesla Powerwall & Powerblocks Per-kWh Lifetime Prices vs Aquion Energy, Eos Energy, & Imergy
 Australia’s largest virtual power plant ramps up in South Australia, ARENA

Powerwall
Grid energy storage
Lithium-ion batteries
Products introduced in 2015
2015 in technology